Striking the colors—meaning lowering the flag (the "colors") that signifies a ship's or garrison's allegiance—is a universally recognized indication of surrender, particularly for ships at sea. For a ship, surrender is dated from the time the ensign is struck.

In international law
"Colours. A national flag (or a battle ensign). The colours . . . are hauled down as a token of submission."

International law absolutely requires a ship of war to fly its ensign at the commencement of any hostile acts, i.e., before firing on the enemy. During battle there is no purpose in striking the colors other than to indicate surrender.

It was and is an offense to continue to fight after striking one's colors, and an offense to continue to fire on an enemy after she has struck her colors, unless she indicates by some other action, such as continuing to fire or seeking to escape, that she has not truly surrendered.  For this reason, striking the colors is conclusive evidence of a surrender having taken place in the case of a warship, but not in the case of a merchant ship. What would be perfidy in the case of a warship is not in the case of a merchant ship: A merchant ship may strike its colors as a ruse de guerre in an attempt to escape capture, since it does not engage the enemy in combat.

In distinction to striking one's colors, hoisting a white flag, in itself, is not an indication of surrender. Rather, hoisting a white flag indicates a request for a truce in order to communicate with the enemy. Under the Geneva Conventions, persons carrying or waving a white flag are still not to be fired upon, nor are they allowed to open fire.

Understood meaning

Nailing the colors to the mast is a traditional sign of defiance, indicating that the colors will never be struck, that the ship will never surrender. On 23 September 1779, Capt. Richard Pearson of HMS Serapis, nailed the British ensign to the ensign staff with his own hands before going into battle against Continental Navy ship Bonhomme Richard. He had to tear it down himself when surrendering. 

During the same battle, Bonhomme Richard'''s ensign was shot away. When Pearson saw that the colors were down, he asked Capt. John Paul Jones of Bonhomme Richard if Jones had struck his colors. Jones has been quoted as replying, "I have not yet begun to fight".

In 1807, when the captain of United States frigate Chesapeake refused to permit officers of HMS Leopard to search her for deserters from the Royal Navy, Leopard ranged alongside Chesapeake and fired into her for ten minutes until Chesapeake struck her colors as a token of surrender. The British refused to accept the ship as a prize of war, the two nations being at peace. Log of U.S. frigate Chesapeake: "Having one Gun ready fired and haul'd down our Colours. the Leopard ceased firing and sent her Boat on board."

In 1811, while the United States and Great Britain were at peace with each other, U.S. frigate President engaged HM sloop of war Little Belt. John Rodgers, Captain of President reported to the Secretary of the Navy, that "when perceiving our opponent's Gaff & Colours down . . . I . . . embraced the earliest moment to stop our fire and prevent the further effusion of blood."

On 29 July 1812, at the start of the War of 1812, Lt. William M. Crane, USN, commanding officer of U.S. brig Nautilus, reported his capture by a British squadron in these words: "the chasing ship put her helm up hoisted a broad pendant and English colours and ranged under my lee quarter—unable to resist I was compelled to strike the Flag of the United States."

Captain David Porter, USN, of U.S. frigate Essex reported the capture of HM brig Alert on 13 August 1812 in these words: "He avoided the dreadful consequences that our broad side would in a few moments have produced by prudentially striking his colours."

On 19 August 1812, U.S. frigate Constitution chased a large vessel. Captain Isaac Hull, USN, reported that "As we bore up she hoisted an English Ensign at the Mizen Gaff, another in the Mizen Shrouds, and a Jack at the Fore, and MizentopGallant mast heads." After the ships had engaged each other, Hull looked to see if the enemy ship, which proved to be HM frigate Guerriere, had surrendered by striking its colors: "not knowing whither the Enemy had struck, or not, we stood off for about half an hour, to repair our Braces, and such other rigging, as had been shot away, and wore around to return to the Enemy, it being now dark we could not see whether she had any colours, flying or not, but could discover that she had raised a small flag Staff or Jury mast forward. I ordered a Boat hoisted out, and sent Lieutenant Reed on board as a flag [of truce] to see whether she had surrendered or not." Captain James Richard Dacres, RN, of Guerriere reported the surrender in these words: "When calling my few remaining officers together, they were all of opinion that any further resistance would be a needless waste of lives, I order'd, though reluctantly, the Colours to be struck."

The Journal of HMS Poictiers reports the capture of U.S. sloop of war Wasp on 18 October 1812 as follows: "Fired Several Shot at the chase, Observed [chase] hoist American Colours, . . . Shortnd sail, the chase having Struck her colours."

Captain William Bainbridge, USN, reported the surrender of HM frigate Java to USS Constitution on 29 December 1812 by the following minutes taken during the action: "At 4.5 [o'clock] Having silenced the fire of the enemy completely and his colours in main Rigging being [down] Supposed he had Struck, Then hawl'd about the Courses to shoot ahead to repair our rigging, which was extremely cut, leaving the enemy a complete wreck, soon after discovered that The enemies flag was still flying hove too to repair Some of our damages. At 4.20 [o'clock] The Enemies Main Mast went by the board. At 4.50 [Wore] ship and stood for the Enemy. At 5.25 [o'clock] Got very close to the enemy in a very [effective] raking position, athwart his bows & was at the very instance of raking him, when he most prudently Struck his Flag." Lt. Henry D. Chads, RN, of Java, reported her surrender thus: "At 5:50 our Colours were lowered from the Stump of the Mizen Mast and we were taken possession a little after 6."

U.S. sloop of war Hornet engaged HM brig sloop Peacock on 24 February 1813. Badly damaged and sinking, Peacock, as a sign of surrender, lowered her ensign, and as an additional sign of distress, hoisted an ensign union down from the fore rigging. Her main mast fell shortly after this signal of surrender. Her senior surviving officer thought it necessary to give an additional sign of surrender since her ensign had fallen into the water. He wrote, "I was compelled . . . to wave my Hat in acknowledgement of having struck the Ensign having fallen with the Gaff into the Water."

References

Footnotes

Works citedMost of the information for this article was obtained from the Naval Historical Center and is in the public domain.''

Flag practices
Nautical terminology
Ensigns
Maritime culture

de:Flagge#Hissen und Streichen der Flagge